This is a list of issue covers of TV Guide magazine from the decade of the 1990s, from January 1990 to December 1999. The entries on this table include each cover's subjects and their artists (photographer or illustrator). This list is for the regular weekly issues of TV Guide, and includes covers that are national or regional in nature, along with any covers that were available exclusively to subscribers. Any one-time-only special issues of TV Guide are not included.

1990

1991

1992

1993

1994

1995

1996

1997

1998

1999

Sources
Covers and table of contents page descriptions for the various issues.
 TV Guide: Fifty Years of Television, New York, NY: Crown Publishers, 2002. 
Stephen Hofer, ed., TV Guide: The Official Collectors Guide, Braintree, Mass.: BangZoom Publishers, 2006.  .
 "50 Greatest TV Guide Covers", article from the June 15, 2002 edition of TV Guide
 Information from ellwanger.tv's TV Guide collection section

External links
TV Guide cover archive: 1990s

Covers
1990s television-related lists
1990s in American television
TV Guide